Orešany is a municipality in the Topoľčany District of the Nitra Region, Slovakia. In 2011 it had 325 inhabitants.

References

External links
 
 
https://web.archive.org/web/20140322134514/http://en.e-obce.sk/obec/oresany/oresany.html

Villages and municipalities in Topoľčany District